James Clarke may refer to:

Entertainment
James P. Clarke (composer) (1807/8–1877), Canadian composer
James Kenelm Clarke (born 1941), British film director, producer and composer
James Clarke (composer) (born 1957), British composer
James Clarke (author) (born 1972), cinema author

Politics
James Clarke (Iowa politician) (1812–1850), American politician and Governor of Iowa Territory
James Paul Clarke (1854–1916), American politician from Arkansas
James M. Clarke (1917–1999), American politician and farmer from North Carolina
James Clarke, leader of the Renew Party in the United Kingdom
Jim Clarke (Northern Ireland politician), Unionist politician in Northern Ireland
James Clarke (died 1599), English MP for Leicester
James Clarke (died 1612), English MP for Mitchell
James Clarke (died 1621), English MP for Taunton

Sports
James Clarke (athlete) (1874–1929), Irish Olympic tug of war competitor
James Clarke (footballer, born 1913), English footballer for Bradford City and Rotherham United
James Clarke (footballer, born 1923), English footballer for Nottingham Forest
James Clarke (footballer, born 1982), English footballer for Rochdale and Grimsby Town
James Clarke (footballer, born 1989), English footballer for Newport County
James Clarke (footballer, born 2000), Irish footballer for Mansfield Town F.C.
James Clarke (cricketer) (born 1979), English cricketer
James Clarke (rower) (born 1984), British lightweight rower
Jim Clarke (Gaelic footballer), played for Donegal
Jim Clarke (ice hockey) (born 1954), Canadian defenceman

Other
James Clarke (antiquary) (1798–1861), English antiquary and amateur poet
James Clarke (VC) (1894–1947), English World War I soldier and recipient of the Victoria Cross
James Fernandez Clarke (1812–1876), English surgeon and medical writer
James Freeman Clarke (1810–1888), American preacher and author
James Stanier Clarke (1766–1834), English cleric, author and librarian to the Prince of Wales
James Franklin Clarke Jr., American historian

See also
Clarke
James Clarke Hook (1819–1907), English painter
James Clark (disambiguation)
James Clerk (disambiguation)
Jamie Clarke (disambiguation)